Damita Jo DeBlanc (August 5, 1930 – December 25, 1998), known professionally as Damita Jo, was an American actress, comedian, and singer. Her second marriage was to her manager James "Biddy" Wood in 1961.

Biography
DeBlanc was born in Austin, Texas, United States. She was the featured vocalist on albums by Steve Gibson and the Red Caps during the 1950s. She later married Gibson, but they parted ways professionally and personally in 1959. The couple had a daughter, Stephanie Latrelle Gibson born April 12, 1955, who carried on the family's musical tradition as a singer and pianist. Her lessons began at the age of 4. She married Nathan Fred Shelton of West Virginia, and had twin boys, Bruce Thomas Shelton and Brian Stephen Shelton in Montclair, New Jersey.

Credited as Damita Jo, DeBlanc had some chart success in the early 1960s with two answer songs: 1960's "I'll Save the Last Dance for You" (an answer to "Save the Last Dance for Me") and 1961's "I'll Be There" (an answer to "Stand by Me"). Both songs were originally sung by Ben E. King (the former with the Drifters) and made the R&B top 20, and "I'll Be There" also reached number 12 on the pop chart. In 1962 she recorded "Dance with a Dolly (With a Hole in her Stocking)", previously made famous by the Andrews Sisters and Bill Haley, for Mercury Records. In 1966 she had a minor hit with a cover of the Jacques Brel song "If You Go Away." She was successful in Sweden, where "I'll Save the Last Dance for You" peaked at number 2 (March 1961), "Do What You Want" at number 5 (July 1961) and "Dance with a Dolly (With a Hole in her Stocking)" at number 3  (January 1962).
 
She worked with Ray Charles, Count Basie, and Lionel Hampton. In 1963, she released a recording for Mercury with Billy Eckstine and the Bobby Tucker Orchestra.  She was involved in comedy and toured with Redd Foxx.

In 1998, she suffered a respiratory illness and died on December 25 in Baltimore, Maryland.

Discography

Albums

Singles

Filmography
 2009  Damita Jo: The Lady is a Tramp (Arkadia Jazz DVD)

References

External links
 
 Biography at the Handbook of Texas Online

1930 births
1998 deaths
20th-century African-American women singers
African-American actresses
African-American female comedians
American women comedians
American rhythm and blues singers
RCA Victor artists
Vee-Jay Records artists
Epic Records artists
Actresses from Austin, Texas
Musicians from Austin, Texas
Respiratory disease deaths in Maryland
Mercury Records artists
American women jazz singers
American jazz singers
Lounge musicians
Traditional pop music singers
20th-century American actresses
20th-century American singers
20th-century American women singers
20th-century American comedians
Jazz musicians from Texas